The 3rd convocation of the People's Assembly of Abkhazia was in place from 2002 until 2007.

Speaker, Vice Speakers and Committee Chairmen
The third convocation held its first session on 2 April 2002, led by its oldest member Ivan Zarandia and attended by Vice President Valeri Arshba. There were two candidates for Speaker, Nugzar Ashuba and Kesou Khagba. Ashuba was elected with 23 votes against ten (one vote was invalid). Parliament elected three Vice Speakers, one more than during the previous convocation: Konstantin Ozgan, Sergei Dbar and Aleksandr Stranichkin.

On 5 April, five committees and one commission were constituted. Ilia Gamisonia was elected head of the Committee for the Budget and Economic Policy, Vladimir Nachach-ogly head of the Committee for Legislation, Beslan Butba head of the Committee for Inter-Parliamentary and External Relations, Batal Khagush head of the Committee for Science, Education and Culture, Galust Trapizonyan head of the Committee for Social Policy and Emma Gamisonia head of the Commission for Human Rights. Upon the initiative of Vice Speaker Sergei Dbar, the constitution of the Committee for Defence and National Security was postponed until after the rerun in constituency No. 2. On 1 August, the winner of the rerun Garik Samanba was elected chairman of the Defence Committee.

On 10 March 2006, Vice Speaker Alexander Stranichkin was appointed Vice Premier. On 28 March, his successor was elected. Albert Ovsepyan, whose candidacy had been suggested by Stranichkin himself, defeated Galust Trapizonyan with 18 votes to 15.

Factions
The 3rd convocation was the first convocation of the People's Assembly to form political factions. On 29 January 2003, 14 deputies formed the pro-government faction Republic, led by Temur Achugba. Its creation was criticised as divisive by some of the remaining deputies and a special session dedicated to discussing this development was held on 4 February.

The founding members of Republic were Achugba, Raji Avidzba, Vladimir Ashkhatsava, Marina Bartsyts, Aslan Bartsits, Viacheslav Vardania, Andzor Goov, Albert Kapikyan, Valeri Kandakov, Gennadi Nikitchenko, Konstantin Pilia, Viacheslav Sakania, Kesou Khagba and Tamaz Shonia. Emma Gamisonia's name was originally included in the list, but it became clear this had been done without her knowledge and against her will. Batal Khagush joined before December 2004. Other deputies later left the faction, Vardania on 29 April 2003, Kapikyan before February 2014 and Kandakov and Nikitchenko before December 2004. Most of its members supported outgoing Prime Minister Raul Khajimba in the October 2004 presidential election. On 16 December, following the Tangerine Revolution, Achugba stepped down as leader.

On 19 February 2004, 15 deputies formed the faction Unity, led by Daur Tarba. Its other members were Vardania, Kapikyan, Emma Gamisonia, Garri Samanba, Galust Trapizonyan, Iuri Kereselidze, Nugzar Agrba, Vitali Tarnava, Ilia Gamisonia, Vakhtang Pipia, Arkadi Jinjia, Beslan Butba, Vladimir Nachach-ogly and Albert Ovsepyan.

By-elections

Constituency no. 13
On 27 June 2002, newly elected Vice-Speaker Sergei Dbar died of a heart attack. The by-election for constituency No. 13 was held on 12 October. Candidates could be nominated until 12 September, while the registration period ran until 2 October. Two candidates were registered: Garri Aiba and Marina Bartsyts. The election was won by Bartsits.

Constituency no. 31 (first time)
A by-election was organised for 5 April 2003 in constituency No. 31 following the death of Anatoli Khashba. Three candidates were nominated by initiative groups: Tkvarcheli District Assembly Chairman Zaur Jinjolia, businessman and Executive Secretary of Apsny Nugzar Agrba and businessman David Chanchikov. The election was won by Agrba and he was registered as deputy on 9 April.

Constituencies no. 6 and 29
On 11 March 2005, the parliamentary terms of Vakhtang Pipia and Daur Tarba were terminated, due to their being appointed Minister for Taxes and Fees and Chairman of the State Committee for Property and Privatisation, respectively. The by-elections in constituencies No. 6 and 29 were scheduled for 15 May.

There were three candidates in constituency No. 6: head of the association Inva-Assistance Valerian Tkhagushev received 666 votes (48.9%) Gulripshi District Head Adgur Kharazia 497 votes (36.5%) and Leonid Osia 170 votes (12.5%). Since none of the candidates received an absolute majority of the votes, a second round was held on 29 May, in which Tkhagushev defeated Kharazia by 966 (56%) votes to 722.

In constituency no. 29 there was only a single candidate running, Beslan Jopua.

Constituency no. 31 (second time)
On 25 September 2005, a by-election was held in constituency No. 31 in Tkvarcheli, to replace Nugzar Agrba who was appointed to a government post. Jambulat Arshba was elected with 906 out of 923 votes, the total number of registered voters was 2079.

Constituency no. 7
On 10 March 2006, Alexander Stranichkin was appointed Vice Premier by President Bagapsh. On 19 April, the Central Election Commission announced that the by-election in constituency No. 7 would be held on 4 June. The Central Election Commission registered three candidates: Suren Kerselyan, Iakub Lakoba and Pavel Leshchuk. None of the candidates achieved an absolute majority in the first round, and so a second round was held on 26 August, in which Leshchuk defeated Lakoba with 752 (64%) against 368 votes. Leshchuk was officially registered as deputy on 11 September.

List of Members

References

 
People's Assembly of Abkhazia